House Copse is a  biological Site of Special Scientific Interest west of Crawley in West Sussex.

This ancient wood was formerly managed as hornbeam and small-leaved lime coppice with oak standards. There is limited ground flora in densely shaded areas, but the banks of a stream have more diverse flora, including dog’s mercury, wood avens, bugle and enchanter’s nightshade.

The site is private land with no public access.

References

Sites of Special Scientific Interest in West Sussex
Forests and woodlands of West Sussex